

Portugal
 Angola –
 José Rodrigues Coelho do Amaral, Governor-General of Angola (1854–1860)
 Carlos Augusto Franco, Governor-General of Angola (1860–1861)

United Kingdom
 Auckland Province, Superintendent – John Williamson
Province of Canada – Sir Edmund Walker Head, 8th Baronet (1854–1861)
Cape Colony – Sir George Grey (1854–1861)
 Robert Wynyard, acting governor
Jamaica – Charles Henry Darling (1857–1863)
Malta Colony – John Le Marchant, Governor of Malta (1858–1864)
New South Wales – Sir William Denison, Governor of New South Wales (1855–1861)
 Queensland – Sir George Bowen, Governor of Queensland (1859–1868)
 Tasmania – Sir Henry Young, Governor of Tasmania (1855–1861)
 South Australia – Sir Richard Graves MacDonnell, Governor of South Australia (1855–1862)
 Victoria – Sir Henry Barkly, Governor of Victoria (1856–1863)
 Western Australia – Sir Arthur Kennedy, Governor of Western Australia (1855–1862)

United States
New Mexico Territory – Abraham Rencher (1857–1861)
Utah Territory – Alfred Cumming (1858–1861)

Colonial governors
Colonial governors
1860